Birkett  may refer to:

People with the surname
 Arthur Birkett (1875–1941), English cricketer
 Bill Birkett, British nature writer and photographer
 Charles Blair Birkett, Canadian diplomat
 Cliff Birkett (1933–1997), English footballer
 Dea Birkett (born 1958), British writer
 Glenn W. Birkett (1888–1950), American politician and farmer
 Joe Birkett (born 1955), the DuPage County State's Attorney and former Republican nominee for Illinois Lieutenant Governor
 Lionel Birkett (1905–1998), West Indian Barbadian cricketer 
 Myles Birkett Foster (1825–1899), watercolour artist in the Victorian period
 Norman Birkett, 1st Baron Birkett (1883–1962), British barrister and judge
 Ralph Birkett (1913–2002), English footballer
 Reg Birkett (1849–1898), English footballer
 Thomas Birkett (1844–1920), mayor of Ottawa, Canada in 1891 and a member of the Canadian House of Commons representing Ottawa City from 1900 to 1904
 Thomas Miles Birkett (1872–?), Ontario merchant and political figure
 William Birkett (cricketer) (1874–1934), English cricketer
 Zoe Birkett (born 1985), one of the youngest contestants on the ITV show Pop Idol

People with the given name
 Birkett D. Fry (1822–1891), an adventurer, soldier, lawyer, cotton manufacturer, and a Confederate general in the American Civil War

Other uses
 Baron Birkett, a hereditary title in the Peerage of the United Kingdom
 Birkett (hill), a British hill categorisation for peaks above 1,000 ft in the Lake District

See also
 Bob Birket (1879–1933), English professional footballer